A Painter's Idyl is a short silent film from 1911, directed and interpreted by Hobart Bosworth.

Production 
The film was produced by William Nicholas Selig for his company,  Selig Polyscope Company.

Distribution 
Distributed by the General Film Company, the film—a short reel—was released in US cinemas October 27, 1911.

References

External links

 A Painter's Idyll at IMDb

1911 short films
American silent films
1910s English-language films
Silent short films